was a Japanese male water polo player. He was a member of the Japan men's national water polo team. He competed with the team at the 1932 Summer Olympics and 1936 Summer Olympics.

References

External links
 

1912 births
1984 deaths
Japanese male water polo players
Water polo players at the 1932 Summer Olympics
Water polo players at the 1936 Summer Olympics
Olympic water polo players of Japan
Sportspeople from Osaka Prefecture
Place of death missing
Japanese sportsperson-politicians
20th-century Japanese people